Phillips Grove is a hamlet in the Canadian province of Saskatchewan.

Demographics 

References

Big River No. 555, Saskatchewan
Designated places in Saskatchewan
Organized hamlets in Saskatchewan
Division No. 16, Saskatchewan